Longewala is a border town in the Thar Desert in the western part of Jaisalmer district, in the state of Rajasthan, India.

See also
 List of military disasters
 Battle of Longewala

References

Cities and towns in Jaisalmer district